Tugarinov is a Russian surname. Notable persons with the surname include:

 Arkady Yakovlevich Tugarinov (1880–1948), Russian-Soviet ornithologist
 Ivan Ivanovich Tugarinov (1905–1966), Soviet diplomat
 Roman Ruslanovich Tugarinov (born 1999), Russian soccer player